Carl and Cole station is a light rail stop on the Muni Metro N Judah line, located in the Cole Valley neighborhood of San Francisco, California. The western portal of the Sunset Tunnel is located just east of the station. The station opened with the N Judah line on October 21, 1928.

The station has transit bulbs which extend the sidewalk of Carl Street, to meet trains like a side platform, allowing passengers to board or depart from trains. The stops are located just before trains cross Cole Street. Two mini-high platforms are located east of the main platforms, at the Sunset Tunnel portal which provide access to both lines for people with disabilities.

The project which built the transit bulbs was approved in 2011 and constructed in 2012. Further streetscape improvements on the bulbs began construction as part of the Inner Sunset Streetscape Project in September 2017.

References

External links 

SFMTA – Carl St & Cole St: inbound and outbound

Muni Metro stations
Haight-Ashbury, San Francisco
Railway stations in the United States opened in 1928
1928 establishments in California